Farmington Public Schools may refer to:
Farmington Public Schools (Connecticut)
Farmington Public Schools (Michigan)

See also
 Farmington School District, school district in Arkansas
 Farmington Municipal Schools, school district in New Mexico